The Dornier Do 212 was a four-seat experimental amphibian flying boat built by the Swiss subsidiary of Dornier, in Altenrhein on Lake Constance. Design was initiated in 1938 by the German and Swiss branches, the latter being responsible for the actual construction of the prototype.

The Do 212 was an all-metal cantilever monoplane with fixed wingtip floats and a 343 kW (460 hp) Hirth HM 512-B-0 12-cylinder air-cooled engine which, mounted aft of the cabin, was buried in the fuselage and drove a four-blade airscrew aft of the tail by means of a shaft which could be tilted upward 12° to provide water clearance.

Initial water taxiing trials resulted in the enlarging of the wingtip floats. On 3 August 1942, a few attempts to take off from water were made, but these failed. A Do 24 was used to tow the Do 212 and it finally flew; however, instability forced the pilot to ditch just after takeoff. Further trials ended the same way. Difficulties were also experienced with the extension shaft, and the cooling of the engine presented a problem. Consequently, no further testing was undertaken, and the prototype was scrapped in 1943.

Specifications (Do 212)

References

External links

Air-Britain.com

 

Flying boats
1940s German experimental aircraft
Do 212
Single-engined pusher aircraft
Mid-engined aircraft
High-wing aircraft
Amphibious aircraft
Aircraft first flown in 1942